The 1982–83 West Midlands (Regional) League season was the 83rd in the history of the West Midlands (Regional) League, an English association football competition for semi-professional and amateur teams based in the West Midlands county, Shropshire, Herefordshire, Worcestershire and southern Staffordshire.

Premier Division

The Premier Division featured 18 clubs which competed in the division last season, along with two clubs, promoted from Division One:
Atherstone United
Wolverhampton United

League table

References

External links

1982–83
8